Mundet is a Barcelona Metro station, in the Horta-Guinardó district of Barcelona, which takes its name from the Recinte Mundet, an adjacent area that now houses a campus of the University of Barcelona. The station is served by line L3.

The station is located underneath the Passeig de la Vall d'Hebron and the Ronda de Dalt expressway, between Avinguda de Can Marcet and Passeig dels Castanyers. Access to the station is provided by an underground passageway allowing passengers to cross under the Ronda de Dalt; access is by stairs, escalators, and elevators north of the station, and level to the south, allowing the station to be supplied with natural light.

The station was opened in 2001, when the section of line L3 from Montbau station to Canyelles station was inaugurated. It was designed by Ventura Valcarce.

Gallery

References

External links
 

Barcelona Metro line 3 stations
Railway stations in Spain opened in 2001